Rod Laver and Darlene Hard successfully defended their title, defeating Bob Howe and Maria Bueno in the final, 13–11, 3–6, 8–6 to win the mixed doubles tennis title at the 1960 Wimbledon Championships.

Seeds

  Rod Laver /  Darlene Hard (champions)
  Bob Howe /  Maria Bueno (final)
  Roy Emerson /  Ann Haydon (third round)
  Bob Hewitt /  Jan Lehane (fourth round)

Draw

Finals

Top half

Section 1

Section 2

Section 3

Section 4

Bottom half

Section 5

Section 6

Section 7

Section 8

References

External links

X=Mixed Doubles
Wimbledon Championship by year – Mixed doubles